Hartmut Reich (born 7 May 1956) is a retired flyweight freestyle wrestler from East Germany. Between 1977 and 1982 he won five world championship medals, including a gold in 1982. He placed eighth at the 1980 Summer Olympics.

Reich retired around 1988 to become a physical education teacher.

References

1956 births
Living people
German male sport wrestlers
Wrestlers at the 1980 Summer Olympics
Olympic wrestlers of East Germany
World Wrestling Championships medalists
People from Apolda
Sportspeople from Thuringia